On June 10, 1999, the Olympic pipeline operated by Olympic Pipe Line Company, carrying gasoline at the time, exploded in Whatcom Falls Park in Bellingham, Washington. The disaster started at 3:25 PM PDT (22:25 UTC) when a mostly underground gasoline pipeline that crossed Whatcom and Hanna Creeks ruptured due to various errors and malfunctions on the part of Olympic Pipeline and others. The gasoline vapors exploded at 5:02 PM PDT, sending a fireball down Whatcom Creek. Three people died in the incident.

Background

Olympic Pipe Line Company ran a network of fuel pipes beginning at refineries in Whatcom County and Anacortes and running south to Seattle and Portland. In 1999, the pipeline was owned and operated by Equilon, a joint venture between Shell Oil and Texaco. As of 2006, the pipeline is 65% owned by Enbridge and 35% owned by BP.

Disaster
The disaster began as Olympic Pipeline was transporting gasoline from Cherry Point Refinery to terminals in Seattle and Portland, Oregon. A pressure relief valve that was improperly configured failed to open in the  pipeline, which resulted in a surge of pressure after an automatic valve shut for unknown reasons. This resulted in the line rupturing at 3:25 that afternoon, and gasoline began spilling into Hanna Creek just above its confluence with Whatcom Creek. As the gasoline continued to spill, many people in the area called 911 to report the gasoline smell, and an Olympic Pipeline employee who was in the area called the company to inquire whether they had an anomaly.

When the Bellingham Fire Department arrived, massive amounts of gasoline had turned the creek pink, and the fumes were overwhelming. The fire department notified Olympic Pipe Line of the leak and evacuated the area around the creek.

The gasoline exploded at 5:02 PM. The fire exceeded . Local businesses were evacuated, Interstate 5 was closed to traffic, and the Coast Guard stopped maritime traffic in Bellingham Bay in anticipation of the fire travelling the entire length of the creek. However, the fire never extended past Interstate 5.

Emergency responders stopped most of the fires by 6:30 PM; the smoke dissipated by 7:00.

Victims
Three people died in the incident. The first was Liam Wood, 18, who was fly fishing in the creek. He succumbed to the fumes, fell unconscious into the creek and drowned, dying before the explosion.  Two children, Wade King and Stephen Tsiorvas, both 10, were playing near the creek confluence during the explosion. Both survived the blast, but sustained severe burns, dying the next day at Harborview Medical Center in Seattle. There were eight related injuries.

Damage
Property damage was estimated at $58,455,927, most of it caused by the explosion. Many nearby buildings had broken windows. One house was completely destroyed. The city's water treatment plant was near the explosion site, and while the building itself survived, everything inside was destroyed.  The rupture allowed  of gasoline to escape into the creek bed.  Bellingham water treatment personnel were forced to manually add water treatment chemicals to keep the water supply safe until the plant could be rebuilt.

Authorities all noted that the destruction and death toll were much lower than would be expected from such a large explosion. This was due to the explosion being centered in a large, forested park; the fires mostly staying in Whatcom Creek; and the ignition occurring before more gasoline had leaked, which would have resulted in a much larger explosion. The cause of ignition was determined by Bellingham Fire Dept to be a butane lighter in the possession of King and Tsiorvas.

Investigation
After a three-year investigation, investigators pointed to a series of failures, and not just a single error, most of which were the fault of Olympic Pipeline. Olympic Pipeline had failed to properly train employees, and had to contend with a faulty computer SCADA system and pressure relief valve.  In 1994, five years before the accident, an IMCO Construction crew, working on behalf of the City of Bellingham, damaged the pipeline while constructing the city's water treatment plant and failed to notify officials about the damage. Subsequently, Olympic Pipeline failed to find or repair the damage.

Olympic, Equilon and several employees faced a seven count indictment after the investigation in 2002. The companies pleaded guilty to several of the charges, leading to a $112 million settlement, a record at the time. This was the first conviction against a pipeline company under the 1979 Hazardous Liquid Pipeline Safety Act.

Recovery

The Whatcom Falls Park in 2020 describes much of the area around the creek as "sensitive due to hazard trees and for forest recovery from 1999 pipeline explosion."

Bibliography 
Notes

References 

 - Total pages: 213 

1999 in Washington (state)
Disasters in Washington (state)
Bellingham, Washington
Industrial fires and explosions in the United States
1999 industrial disasters